It's Magic is the third album by American jazz vocalist Abbey Lincoln featuring tracks recorded in 1958 for the Riverside label.

Reception

Allmusic awarded the album 4½ stars, stating: "Because Abbey Lincoln has always been careful to sing songs that have a deep meaning for her, all of her recordings through the years are memorable in their own way; there are no duds in her discography... Recommended".

Track listing
 "I Am in Love" (Cole Porter) - 2:49     
 "It's Magic" (Sammy Cahn, Jule Styne) - 4:03     
 "Just for Me" (Jimmy Komack) - 3:36     
 "An Occasional Man" (Ralph Blane, Hugh Martin) - 3:23     
 "Ain't Nobody's Business" (Porter Grainger, Everett Robbins) - 4:29     
 "Out of the Past" (Benny Golson, Jon Hendricks) - 4:46     
 "Music, Maestro, Please!" (Herb Magidson, Allie Wrubel) - 3:18     
 "Love" (Blane, Martin) - 2:41     
 "Exactly Like You" (Dorothy Fields, Jimmy McHugh) - 2:55     
 "Little Niles" (Randy Weston, Hendricks) - 5:03  
Recorded in New York City on July 24 (tracks 3–5, 7 & 9) and August 15 (tracks 1, 2, 6, 8 & 10), 1958

Personnel 
Abbey Lincoln - vocals
Kenny Dorham (tracks 3–5, 7 & 9), Art Farmer (tracks 1, 2, 6, 8 & 10) - trumpet 
Curtis Fuller - trombone (tracks 1, 3, 4, 7 & 8)
Benny Golson - tenor saxophone
Jerome Richardson (tracks 3, 4 & 7), Sahib Shihab (tracks 1 & 8) - baritone saxophone, flute 
Wynton Kelly - piano
Paul Chambers (tracks 3–5, 7 & 9), Sam Jones (tracks 1, 2, 6, 8 & 10) - bass
Philly Joe Jones - drums

References 

1958 albums
Abbey Lincoln albums
Albums produced by Orrin Keepnews
Riverside Records albums